Hemmant railway station is located on the Cleveland line in Queensland, Australia. It serves the Brisbane suburb of Hemmant.  The station opened in 1914.

In November 1996, the Fisherman Islands line to the Port of Brisbane opened to the north of the station.

Services
Hemmant is served by Cleveland line services from Shorncliffe, Northgate, Doomben and Bowen Hills to Manly and Cleveland. Hemmant is 31 minutes from Cleveland and 32 minutes from Central.

Services by platform

References

External links

Hemmant station Queensland's Railways on the Internet
[ Hemmant station] TransLink travel information

Railway stations in Brisbane
Railway stations in Australia opened in 1914